The canton of Le Lézignanais (before 2015: canton of Lézignan-Corbières) is an administrative division of the Aude department, southern France. Its borders were modified at the French canton reorganisation which came into effect in March 2015. Its seat is in Lézignan-Corbières.

It consists of the following communes:
 
Argens-Minervois
Castelnau-d'Aude
Conilhac-Corbières
Cruscades
Escales
Homps
Lézignan-Corbières
Montbrun-des-Corbières
Ornaisons
Tourouzelle

References

Cantons of Aude